Kotapati Murahari Rao (23 December 1933 – 24 November 2011) was an Indian philanthropist, humanist, rationalist, agriculturist, and business magnate.

Rao was the founder and managing director of Pravardhan Seeds Private Limited, president of an NGO named CEASE Child Labour, Founding Chairman of the Seedsmen Association, President of the Andhra Pradesh Seedgrowers, Merchants and Nurserymen Association', Treasurer of the Rationalist Association of India, Founder & President of the Academy of Rural Development and Research (in Gudavalli), Vice-Chairman of the Institute Management Committee Government Tripuraneni Ramaswami Choudary ITI in Gudavalli (Guntur Dt), Founder & President of the Kaviraju Tripuraneni Ramaswami Choudary Trust, Trustee of the Dr. Kasaraneni Jayapradamba Trust, Advisor & Committee Member of the Dr. Rama Naidu Institute of Rural Development, the Vijnanjyothi Foundation. He was a full member of the International Humanist and Ethical Union.

Early life
Kotapati Murahari Rao Garu was born in a Gandhian family. He worked for betterment in the fields of education, health, and village development, as well as in social welfare and social development. He was a good orator, progressive thinker, and idealised figure. Kotapati Murahari Rao Garu was born on 23 December 1933 in the village of Gudavalli, Guntur district, Andhra Pradesh to the late Kotapati Sitarammayya Garu and Chandramma Garu.  Another significance of this particular day was that Mahatma Gandhi laid the foundation stone of the Vinaya Ashramam in Kavur when he was touring Andhra Pradesh as part of the struggle for freedom. Sri Kotapati Sitaramayya Garu inspired people to use the war funds collected during the Second World War from the local farmers by the British government for the establishment of Sri Bollina Muniswamy Naidu Memorial School in Gudavalli.
 
Sri Kotapati Murahari Rao joined this school in the 6th grade and completed the SSLC in 1950. He graduated from Loyola College, Madras. Subsequently, he studied Paper technology in Pune (to advocate for cottage industries that were suppressed by the economic exploitation of the British).

He actively participated in land donation programs as part of the Vinaya Ashram. In 1958, he invited then President of India, Rajendra Prasad, to the Vinaya Ashram to give a speech promoting the Ashram's Gandhian ideals. It was here that he adopted his trademark attire of white khaddar 'Pancha and Lalchi'.

After his father's death, he worked as a science teacher at Muniswamy Naidu Memorial High School. He later worked as a co-operative auditor at Piduguralla, Narsarao Peta and was then transferred to Kaluvakurthy. As a believer of 'svalambana', he left his secured government job and started cultivation on the banks of the Tungabhadra. As a part of the green revolution, he enabled the much-needed progress in the field of agriculture by introducing high-yielding hybrid seeds between 1960 and 1970 for bajra, jowar, and rice. He was recognised as a 'progressive farmer' by the Government of India and received an accolade at the Rashtrapati Bhavan from the President of India at the time.

Along with Kannaganti Papa Rao Garu, he introduced hybrid cotton seeds in Andhra Pradesh as part of the lab-to-land policy of universities in Andhra Pradesh, Karnataka, and Madhya Pradesh'.

He extended the cultivation of seed farming on a larger scale, benefitting many farmers with improved yield and income. Many small and medium farmers took up hybrid seed cultivation, and within no time, Andhra Pradesh became the leading state for hybrid cotton seed production in India, with Hyderabad referred to as the Seed Capital. Subsequently, Sri Kotapati Murahari Rao Garu established Pravardhan Seeds Pvt Limited with the head office of the company in Hyderabad. Over the next few decades he expanded his business through the states of Andhra Pradesh, Karnataka, Madhya Pradesh and Gujarat.

He played a leading role in the development of improved seed cultivation and was the founding chairman of the Seedsmen Association.

He produced a movie in 1975 named Vayasochina Pilla.

In 1976, he established the Academy of Rural Development and Research Centre in his native village Gudavalli. He also established the Kaviraju Tripuraneni Ramaswamy Choudary Industrial Training Centre. He enabled the training of 20,000 people with the help of this academy, including Anganwadi workers hailing from different districts. He established a fund in Kaviraju and Sri Thaapi Dharma Rao's name at Potti Sri Ramulu Telugu University, whose function was to give awards for those pioneering in 'the rational movement and the literary field'.

In 1995, Kotapati Murahari Rao Garu established a hundred bedded hospital named SIMS in the city of Nellore, whose precepts of committed affordable quality medical service aimed to advance the betterment of the society there. Through SIMS, he orchestrated a series of low-cost vaccination camps aimed to benefit everyone irrespective of their economic strata in the villages of Nellore District. This assisted the prevention of Brain fever which was a widespread menace to the general population at the time.

He established a fund in Kakatiya University that allows a gold medal to be presented every year for those who stand first in English. He gave donations for a trust established by Doctor Kasaraneni Sadasivarao Garu in Guntur. Through this trust, he established a Girls Hostel with the strength of 200 by the name 'Kotapati Sarojini Murahari Rao' girls hostel in Guntur.

In 2002, he was elected the chairman of an NGO named CEASE child labour. As the chairman of CEASE CHILD labour, he was committed to eradicating the issue of underage child labour. Through this NGO, he reached out to the school dropouts in the villages to provide them with an opportunity to join schools. He helped the merit students join the Sri RamaNayudu Vignana Jyothi Village Development Society established in Thunika village of Medak district. Its members get training in the field of agriculture, and afterwards, job opportunities are offered to them.

References

External links 
 https://web.archive.org/web/20120426005057/http://ns94.iheu.com/fr/node/1086
 https://web.archive.org/web/20111003054404/http://www.germanwatch.org/tw/bay-stua.pdf
 https://web.archive.org/web/20120426005052/http://labour.ap.gov.in/pdfs/StateActionPlan.pdf
 http://www.iheu.org/files/Sambhavi%20Gudilona%20Badilona.pdf
 https://books.google.com/books?id=AHgJpIHL1AsC&pg=PR4
 http://innaiahn.tripod.com/inn.html
 http://investing.businessweek.com/research/stocks/private/snapshot.asp?privcapId=52520712
 https://web.archive.org/web/20120104114416/http://www.iheu.org/good-news-humanists-christmas-day
 https://www.imdb.com/title/tt1389589/

Businesspeople from Andhra Pradesh
1933 births
2011 deaths
People from Guntur district
Indian rationalists
Indian humanists